The Daily Inter Lake is a daily newspaper based in Kalispell, Montana, the seat of Flathead County. It was founded in the former town of Demersville, Montana, in 1889 by a local couple, Clayton and Emma Ingalls, before moving to the new city of Kalispell two years later.

The Inter Lake is part of the Hagadone Corporation's portfolio of newspapers in Idaho, Montana and Washington state. It is published along with multiple weekly newspapers serving communities in northwestern Montana, including the Hungry Horse News, the Whitefish Pilot, the Bigfork Eagle, the Western News, the Lake County Leader and the Mineral Independent/Clark Fork Valley Press. The Inter Lake also maintains a website, dailyinterlake.com.

Rick Weaver became the Inter Lake's publisher in 2010, following Tom Kurdy in the job.

References

External links
Daily Inter Lake, website

Newspapers published in Montana